A royal mausoleum is a burial place, primarily for the royal family of a particular country.

Mausoleums around the World
Burial sites of European monarchs and consorts
Royal Mausoleum of Hawaii
Royal Mausoleum of Mauretania
 Royal Mausoleum in St. Vitus Cathedral at Prague Castle, Czech republic: burial place of emperors Ferdinand I and Maximilian II and empress Anna of Bohemia and Hungary.
Royal Mausoleum, Frogmore in Windsor, England: burial place of Queen Victoria and Prince Albert
Royal Mausoleum (Norway), in Oslo
Shah Alam Royal Mausoleum, Selangor, Malaysia